Nash is a World War II U.S. Army Large Tug (LT) class seagoing tugboat built as hull #298 at Jakobson Shipyard, Oyster Bay NY as a Design 271 steel-hulled Large Tug delivered November, 1943. Originally named Major Elisha K. Henson (LT-5), in 1946 she was renamed John F. Nash by the U.S. Army Corps of Engineers. Since retirement from the Corps of Engineers, LT-5 has been renamed Major Elisha K. Henson. As of the 1992 date of its listing as a National Historic Landmark, LT-5 was believed to be one of the last functional U.S. Army vessels that participated in Normandy landings.

Service in World War II 
LT-5 sailed to Great Britain in February 1944 in anticipation of Operation Overlord, the planned allied invasion of Europe. On June 6, 1944, LT-5 sailed for Normandy with two barges as part of Operation Mulberry, in support of Overlord. Under fire, the tug ferried supplies to the landing beaches for the next month, in the process shooting down a German fighter aircraft on June 9.

After the war, LT-5 returned to the United States. Assigned to the Buffalo District of the U.S. Army Corps of Engineers in May 1946, LT-5 was renamed John F. Nash. Nash was the Buffalo District's Senior Engineer and Chief Civilian Assistant for the period 1932 to 1941. From 1946 to 1989, Nash served the lower Great Lakes region by assisting in the maintenance of harbors, and construction projects that included the St. Lawrence Seaway in the 1950s.

Post-military career 
Renamed Major Elisha K. Henson, she has been largely restored to her original configuration by the H. Lee White Marine Museum in Oswego, New York where she is currently on display. Tours are available Mid-May through the end of September. LT-5 was declared a National Historic Landmark in 1992.  A sister ship located at Kewaunee, Wisconsin, the  Major Wilbur Fr. Browder (LT-4), now the Tug Ludington, is a museum ship which also served the U.S. Army at D-Day and otherwise has a similar history, which was listed on the National Register in 2002.

Awards
American Campaign Medal
European-African-Middle Eastern Campaign Medal with one campaign star
World War II Victory Medal
National Defense Service Medal with star

References

External links

 Official Site

National Historic Landmarks in New York (state)
Museum ships in New York (state)
Ships on the National Register of Historic Places in New York (state)
Museums in Oswego County, New York
Military and war museums in New York (state)
Ships of the United States Army
National Register of Historic Places in Oswego County, New York
Tugboats of the United States